Burrrprint 2 (also stylized as Burrrprint (2) HD) is a mixtape by  rapper Gucci Mane. It was released three months after the release of his fourth studio album The State vs. Radric Davis on March 13, 2010. It is the sequel to The Burrprint mixtape released in 2009.

Drumma Boy produced all but five songs on the mixtape. These songs were previously recorded before Gucci Mane was sent to jail. However, the introduction to the album was recorded over the phone by Gucci Mane from jail. The album features guest appearances from Shawty Lo, DJ Khaled, Yo Gotti, Nicki Minaj, Rick Ross, Waka Flocka Flame, OJ Da Juiceman, Lil' Kim, Jim Jones, Trey Songz, Ludacris, Rocko, Alley Boy, Wooh Da Kid, and Mylah. Music videos have also been filmed for the songs "911 Emergency", "Boy From the Block", "Everybody Looking" (which has over 10 million views on YouTube), and "Antisocial" featuring Mylah.

The mixtape debuted at number 19 on the Billboard 200 with first-week sales of 19,000 copies. A song from the mixtape, "Beat It Up" featuring Trey Songz, charted on the Billboard Hot R&B/Hip-Hop Songs and Rap Songs charts at numbers 36 and 22, respectively, and appears on the deluxe edition of Gucci Mane's third studio album, The Appeal: Georgia's Most Wanted. "Atlanta Zoo" featuring Ludacris & "911 Emergency" debuted at #15 and #21 on the Bubbling Under R&B/Hip-Hop Singles chart, respectively.

Track listing

Charts

Weekly charts

Year-end charts

References

2010 mixtape albums
Gucci Mane albums
Albums produced by Drumma Boy
Albums produced by Shawty Redd
Albums produced by Fatboi
Warner Records albums
Sequel albums